Hunsur is a city in Mysore district in the Indian state of Karnataka.  It is the headquarters of the Hunsur Taluk administrative division.

Geography
Hunsur is situated on the western side of Mysore city on the way to Virajpet town (SH 90). Madikeri (NH-275) also lies on the western side of Hunsur on another road. Hassan (SH 86) lies on the northern side of Hunsur and H.D.Kote town is on the southern side and Mysore on the Eastern side. Hunsur lies on NH-275 and connects Bangalore to the Nagarahole National Park, Kushalanagar,Madikeri, Kodagu, Mangalore, and Virajpet.

Hunsur has an average elevation of 792 meters (2598 feet). Hunsur city is about 11.76 km2 of the total area. The river Lakshmana Tirtha flows through the town and is crossed by two bridges. The town is the administrative center of Hunsur taluk, which is part of the Mysore District.

Demographics
 India census, Hunsur city had a population of 62668(2020). Males constitute 51% of the population and females 49%. 12% of the population is under six years of age. Hunsur has an average literacy rate of 69%, higher than the national average of 59.5%.

People
 D. Devaraj Urs, former Chief Minister of Karnataka 
 Hunsur Krishnamurthy, director in Kannada Film Industry
 Kemparaj Urs, actor, producer, director

See also 
Saligrama, Mysore

References

Cities and towns in Mysore district